Ackerman is a town in Choctaw County, Mississippi, United States. The population was 1,510 at the 2010 census, down from 1,696 at the 2000 census. It is the county seat of Choctaw County.

It is named for an early European-American landowner.

Geography
Ackerman is located southeast of the present-day center of Choctaw County. Mississippi Highway 15 passes through the town, leading north  to Mathiston and south  to Louisville, Mississippi (pronounced Lewis-ville). 

Mississippi Highway 12 passes through the northwest corner of the town, leading northeast  to Starkville, where Mississippi State University is located, and southwest  to Kosciusko. Mississippi Highway 9 heads north from Highway 12 in the northwest corner of Ackerman, leading  to Eupora.

The town is located near the headwaters of the Yockanookany River, a tributary of the Pearl River.

Climate

Demographics

2020 census

As of the 2020 United States census, there were 1,594 people, 611 households, and 345 families residing in the town.

2000 census
As of the census of 2000, there were 1,696 people, 711 households, and 430 families residing in the town. The population density was 752.7 people per square mile (291.0/km). There were 781 housing units at an average density of 346.6 per square mile (134.0/km). The racial makeup of the town was 62.97% White, 34.85% African American, 0.24% Native American, 0.59% Asian, 0.94% from other races, and 0.41% from two or more races. Hispanic or Latino of any race were 1.47% of the population.

There were 711 households, out of which 29.4% had children under the age of 18 living with them, 38.8% were married couples living together, 17.4% had a female householder with no husband present, and 39.5% were non-families. 37.0% of all households were made up of individuals, and 16.7% had someone living alone who was 65 years of age or older. The average household size was 2.27 and the average family size was 3.00.

In the town, the population was spread out, with 24.6% under the age of 18, 7.8% from 18 to 24, 25.8% from 25 to 44, 21.6% from 45 to 64, and 20.2% who were 65 years of age or older. The median age was 39 years. For every 100 females, there were 81.8 males. For every 100 females age 18 and over, there were 76.0 males.

The median income for a household in the town was $21,287, and the median income for a family was $30,511. Males had a median income of $30,588 versus $20,739 for females. The per capita income for the town was $13,486. About 17.8% of families and 24.7% of the population were below the poverty line, including 33.2% of those under age 18 and 20.1% of those age 65 or over.

Education
Ackerman is served by the Choctaw County School District.

Notable people 
 Ja'Marcus Bradley, professional football player
 The Blackwood Brothers, gospel quartet
 Texas Johnny Brown, blues guitarist, songwriter, and singer
 Turner Catledge (1901—1983), managing editor of the New York Times
 James P. Coleman, governor of Mississippi (1956–1960)
 Josiah D. Coleman, Justice of the Supreme Court of Mississippi and grandson of James P. Coleman
 Joey Hood, member of the Mississippi House of Representatives
 Ray Mabus, governor of Mississippi (1988–1992)
 Coby Miller, Olympic sprinter
 Cheryl Prewitt, Miss America, 1980

References

Towns in Choctaw County, Mississippi
Towns in Mississippi
County seats in Mississippi